

One, Inc. v. Olesen (1958)

Boutilier v. Immigration and Naturalization Service (1967)

Baker v. Nelson (1971) 

In 1972, the Supreme Court dismissed the case of Baker v. Nelson, which effectively denied that homosexual couples have a constitutional right to get married. This ruling was later overturned in Obergefell v. Hodges.

Doe v. Commonwealth's Attorney of Richmond (1976) 

Two gay men anonymously challenged Virginia's sodomy law, arguing that the law violated constitutional rights guaranteed by the First, the Fifth, the Eighth, and Fourteenth Amendments. In Doe v. Commonwealth's Attorney of Richmond, a three-judge panel on the Eastern District of Virginia ruled, by 2 to 1, that the statute was not unconstitutional. On March 29, 1976, the Supreme Court summarily affirmed the decision without oral argument or written decision. Justices Brennan, Thurgood Marshall, and John Paul Stevens noted that they would have set the case for full consideration.

National Gay Task Force v. Board of Education (1985)

Bowers v. Hardwick (1986) 

An openly gay man challenged the sodomy law of Georgia based on an arrest he experienced in early July, 1982 in his home in Atlanta. Michael Hardwick won this case in the Court of Appeals for the Eleventh Circuit. The Circuit Court reasoned that because the Supreme Court had found there to be constitutional rights to childrearing and education, procreation, marriage, contraception, and abortion, it was inevitable that there is a constitutional right to private, consensual sodomy as well. Mike Bowers, the Attorney General of Georgia, appealed to the Supreme Court.

By five to four, the highest court overturned the 11th Circuit Court's decision in Bowers v. Hardwick. Justice Harry Blackmun, who in the previous case of Doe (see above) voted to uphold the Virginia ban on sodomy, now voted to strike down the Georgia ban, joining the three who dissented from Doe. Justice White wrote the majority opinion; Chief Justice Warren E. Burger and Lewis F. Powell wrote concurring opinions; also silently supporting the White opinion were William Rehnquist (soon to become the Chief Justice) and Sandra Day O'Connor. White used three modes of analysis in determining whether sodomy was constitutionally protected: 1) precedents dealing with childrearing and education, procreation, marriage, contraception, and abortion (as the 11th Circuit Court outlined), 2) the plausibility of finding that there is a fundamental right to engage in sodomy, and 3) rational basis review. White rejected Hardwick's claim with all three modes.

"We first register our disagreement with the Court of Appeals and with [Hardwick] that the Court's prior cases have construed the Constitution to confer a right of privacy that extends to homosexual sodomy and, for all intents and purposes, have decided this case." "Accepting the decisions in these cases, ... we think it evident that none of the rights announced in those cases bears any resemblance to the claimed constitutional right of homosexuals to engage in acts of sodomy that is asserted in this case. No connection between family, marriage, or procreation, on the one hand, and homosexual activity, on the other, has been demonstrated, either by the Court of Appeals or by [Hardwick]."

Next, White rejected the prospect that the Court could "announce, as the Court of Appeals did, a fundamental right to engage in homosexual sodomy. This we are quite unwilling to do." He canvassed the history of sodomy laws in the United States: "Proscriptions against that conduct have ancient roots. Sodomy was a criminal offense at common law, and was forbidden by the laws of the original 13 States when they ratified the Bill of Rights. In 1868, when the Fourteenth Amendment was ratified, all but 5 of the 37 States in the union had criminal sodomy laws. ... Against this background, to claim that a right to engage in such conduct is 'deeply rooted in this Nation's history and tradition' or 'implicit in the concept of ordered liberty' is, at best, facetious." And White emphasized that the Court should exercise judicial restraint when possibly pronouncing a new "fundamental right."
Nor are we inclined to take a more expansive view of our authority to discover new fundamental rights imbedded in the Due Process Clause. The Court is most vulnerable and comes nearest to illegitimacy when it deals with judge-made constitutional law having little or no cognizable roots in the language or design of the Constitution. That this is so was painfully demonstrated by the face-off between the Executive and the Court in the 1930's, which resulted in the repudiation of much of the substantive gloss that the Court had placed on the Due Process Clauses of the Fifth and Fourteenth Amendments. There should be, therefore, great resistance to expand the substantive reach of those Clauses, particularly if it requires redefining the category of rights deemed to be fundamental. Otherwise, the Judiciary necessarily takes to itself further authority to govern the country without express constitutional authority.

The last mode of analysis was the rational basis test. Hardwick had asserted "that there must be a rational basis for the law, and that there is none in this case other than the presumed belief of a majority of the electorate in Georgia that homosexual sodomy is immoral and unacceptable. This is said to be an inadequate rationale to support the law. The law, however, is constantly based on notions of morality, and if all laws representing essentially moral choices are to be invalidated under the Due Process Clause, the courts will be very busy indeed."

Wisconsin v. Mitchell (1993)

Romer v. Evans (1996)

Equality Foundation of Greater Cincinnati v. City of Cincinnati (1998)
Voters of the city of Cincinnati held a referendum on "Issue 3," an amendment to the city charter, to do the same thing in that city as the voters of Colorado had done the previous year (see above - Romer v. Evans). Issue 3 of Cincinnati was virtually identical to Amendment 2 of Colorado. The wording of the referendum was this:
NO SPECIAL CLASS STATUS MAY BE GRANTED BASED UPON SEXUAL ORIENTATION, CONDUCT OR RELATIONSHIPS.
The City of Cincinnati and its various Boards and Commissions may not enact, adopt, enforce or administer any ordinance, regulation, rule or policy which provides that homosexual, lesbian, or bisexual orientation, status, conduct, or relationship constitutes, entitles, or otherwise provides a person with the basis to have any claim of minority or protected status, quota preference or other preferential treatment. This provision of the City Charter shall in all respects be self-executing. Any ordinance, regulation, rule or policy enacted before this amendment is adopted that violates the foregoing prohibition shall be null and void and of no force or effect.
It passed on November 2, 1993, with approximately 62% in favor. It became Article XII of the city charter. Lesbian and gay activists in the city had already formed an organization called Equality Foundation of Greater Cincinnati (EFGC), and on November 8 the organization sued the city. Eventually, in 1995, the Sixth Circuit Court of Appeals upheld Issue 3. After the Romer ruling by the Supreme Court, EFGC asked the 6th Circuit to reconsider its decision in light of Romer, but the 6th Circuit upheld Issue 3 a second time, reasoning that Issue 3 was distinguishable from Colorado's Amendment 2 because the former operated on a citywide level whereas the latter would have operated on a statewide level. EFGC then asked the Supreme Court to grant certiorari, but on October 13, 1998, the Supreme Court denied the petition by a vote of 6 to 3. Justices Stevens, Ginsburg, and Breyer - who were in the majority in Romer - dissented from the denial of petition, whereas Justices Kennedy, O'Connor, and Souter - who had also been in the majority in Romer - joined Rehnquist, Scalia, and Thomas in denying the petition.

In 2004, voters in Cincinnati voted on whether to repeal Article XII of the city charter, and it was successfully repealed.

Oncale v. Sundowner Offshore Services, Inc. (1998)

Boy Scouts of America v. Dale (2000)

Lawrence v. Texas (2003)

Hollingsworth v. Perry (2013)

United States v. Windsor (2013)

Obergefell v. Hodges (2015)

Bostock v. Clayton County (2020)

Altitude Express, Inc. v. Zarda (2020)

R.G. & G.R. Harris Funeral Homes Inc. v. Equal Employment Opportunity Commission (2020)

See also 
 
 Goodridge v. Department of Public Health (2003), the court case that legalized same-sex marriage in Massachusetts (first state to do so  in the U.S.)

Notes

References 

Lists of United States Supreme Court cases
LGBT-related lists